Marappullige Jayasinghe is a Sri Lankan politician and the 9th Governor of the North Central Province. He has previously been the Governor of the Uva Province.

References

Living people
Governors of Uva Province
Sinhalese politicians
Year of birth missing (living people)